Miss Asia may refer to:

Miss Asia Pageant, organized by the Asia Television Limited in Hong Kong
, organized in the United States for Asian American Women
Miss Universe, an annual international beauty pageant
Miss World, the oldest running international beauty pageant
Miss International, a Tokyo-based international beauty pageant

See also
Miss Asia Pacific International, a 1968–2020 beauty pageant in the Philippines
Miss Asia Pacific World, a beauty pageant in South Korea established in 2011